Antaeotricha parastis is a moth in the family Depressariidae. It was described by van Gijen in 1913. It is found in Chile.

References

Moths described in 1913
parastis
Moths of South America
Endemic fauna of Chile